The 2019 Plateau State House of Assembly election was held on March 9, 2019, to elect members of the Plateau State House of Assembly in Nigeria. All the 24 seats were up for election in the Plateau State House of Assembly.

Abok Ayuba from APC representing Jos East constituency was elected Speaker, while Saleh Yipmong from APC representing Dengi constituency was elected Deputy Speaker.

Results 
The result of the election is listed below.

 Peter Ibrahim Gyendeng from PDP won Barkin-Ladi constituency
 Musa Agah Avia from PDP won Rukuba/Irigwe constituency
 Amarudu Aten Usiani from APC won Bokkos constituency
 Abok Ayuba from APC won Jos East constituency
 Ibrahim Baba Hassan from APC won Jos North-North constituency
 Mrs Dusu Esther Simi from PDP won Jos North-West constituency
 Dalyop Gwottson F. from PDP won Jos South constituency
 Wallk Philip Goma from APC won Kanke constituency
 Dasun Philip Peter from APC won Pankshin North constituency
 Henry Soembis Longs from APC won Pankshin South constituency
 Saleh Yipmong from APC won Dengi constituency
 Ismaila Hudu Bala from APC won Kantana constituency
 Pirfa Jingfa Tyem from PDP won Langtang North-North constituency
 Daniel Nanbol Listick from PDP won Langtang Central constituency
 Zimtim Sochang from PDP won Langtang South constituency
 Bala Fwanje N. from PDP won Mangu South constituency
 Abdul Adamu Yanga from APC won Mangu North-East constituency
 Naanlong Gapyil Daniel from APC won Mikang constituency
 Eric Piangat Dakogol from APC won Qua'an Pan North constituency
 Abubakar Mohammed N from APC won Qua’an Pan South constituency
 Timothy Dantong from PDP won Riyom constituency
 Kwapfuan Livinus James from APC won Shendam constituency
 Yahaya Adamu from APC won Wase constituency
 Ezekiel Afon from APC won Pengana constituency

References 

Plateau
Plateau State elections